The 1948 Chicago Rockets season was their third in the All-America Football Conference. The team matched their previous output of 1–13, failing to qualify for the playoffs for the third consecutive season.

The Rockets had a turnover margin of minus-30, which is tied for the worst in professional football history.

The team's statistical leaders included Jesse Freitas with 1,425 passing yards, Eddie Prokop with 266 rushing yards, and Fay King with 647 receiving yards and 42 points scored.

Season schedule

Division standings

References

Chicago Rockets seasons
Chicago Rockets